The International Ethics Standards Board for Accountants (IESBA) develops and promotes the International Code of Ethics for Professional Accountants (including International Independence Standards). The IESBA also supports debate on issues related to accounting ethics and auditor independence.

Organization
The IESBA is an independent global standard-setting board. The IESBA’s mission is to serve the public interest by setting ethics standards, including auditor independence requirements, which seek to raise the bar for ethical conduct and practice for all professional accountants.

The IESBA sets its standards in the public interest with advice from the IESBA Consultative Advisory Group (CAG) and under the oversight of the Public Interest Oversight Board (PIOB).

The IESBA is dedicated to operating as transparent as possible. IESBA meetings are open to the public. The agendas, agenda papers,  meeting highlights and audio recordings for each meeting are posted on the IESBA's website. In addition, the IESBA's website includes information about the IESBA's Strategy and Work Plan and its various projects and initiatives. The IESBA's website also includes resources, including Staff Q&As and the IESBA eCode to help support the adoption and implementation of the IESBA Code.

Activities
In 2018, the IESBA issued a revised and restructured Code which came into effect in June 2019. The revised and restructured Code includes many substantive revisions, including in relation to non-compliance with laws and regulations (NOCLAR). The 2018 version of the Code makes it clear that professional accountants, in whatever capacity they are engaged, cannot turn a blind eye to NOCLAR. The provisions in the Code, including NOCLAR guide ethical behavior and help professional accountants uphold their responsibility to act in the public interest. The IESBA Code also includes a principles-based definition of what constitutes a network. The definition covers the way a group of companies operate and present themselves, and is consistent with the Statutory Audit Directive.

The IESBA periodically issues revisions to the IESBA Code. In 2019, the IESBA issued revisions to Part 4B of the IESBA Code to Reflect Terms and Concepts Used in ISAE 3000 (Revised). Part 4B of the Code comprises the independence standards for assurance engagements other than audit and review engagements.

Convergence of international and national ethical standards is a high priority for the IESBA. Accordingly, IESBA members, Technical Advisors and Staff participate in various stakeholder outreach meetings and events to promote awareness and adoption of the IESBA Code.

IFAC supports and promotes the development, adoption, and implementation of high-quality international standards, including the Code. IFAC periodically issues a Global Status Report on the adoption of international standards, including the IESBA Code. The most recent Global Status Report was issued in October 2019.

Professional accountancy organizations who are members the International Federation of Accountants (IFAC), such as Institute of Chartered Accountants in England and Wales (ICAEW), the Association of International Certified Professional Accountants (AICPA), the Institute of Management Accountants (IMA) and Institute of Chartered Accountants of Scotland (ICAS) bodies are required to adopt the IESBA Code of Ethics.

In addition, the Forum of Firms which is an independent association of international networks of firms that perform transnational audits commits to having policies and methodologies that conform to the IESBA Code and national codes of ethics.

References

External links
 Official website

Professional ethics
Accounting